Josh Navidi (born 30 December 1990) is a Welsh international rugby union player who plays for the Cardiff Rugby, Wales and British and Irish Lions. He has previously captained Wales U20.

Personal life
Navidi's father is Iranian and his mother is Welsh. He can speak Welsh. Navidi received his secondary education at St Bede's College, Christchurch, New Zealand where he was a member of the senior college rugby team.

International
In January 2013 Navidi was selected in the 35 man Wales squad for the 2013 Six Nations championship.

In May 2013 Navidi was selected in the Wales national rugby union team 32 man training squad for the summer 2013 tour to Japan. He made his international debut against Japan at openside flanker on 15 June 2013.

Navidi was a squad member at the 2019 Rugby World Cup, and played in four matches before a hamstring injury ended his participation in the tournament.
He was called up to the British and Irish Lions squad for the 2021 tour to South Africa following the injury to Justin Tipuric.

International tries

References

External links 
Cardiff Rugby Profile
Josh Navidi Twitter

1990 births
Living people
Rugby union players from Bridgend
Welsh rugby union players
Glamorgan Wanderers RFC players
Cardiff RFC players
Cardiff Rugby players
Wales international rugby union players
Welsh people of Iranian descent
Sportspeople of Iranian descent
People educated at St Bede's College, Christchurch
Rugby union flankers
British & Irish Lions rugby union players from Wales